Soil science is the study of soil as a natural resource on the surface of the Earth including soil formation, classification and mapping; physical, chemical, biological, and fertility properties of soils; and these properties in relation to the use and management of soils.

Sometimes terms which refer to branches of soil science, such as pedology (formation, chemistry, morphology, and classification of soil) and edaphology (how soils interact with living things, especially plants), are used as if synonymous with soil science.  The diversity of names associated with this discipline is related to the various associations concerned.  Indeed, engineers, agronomists, chemists, geologists, physical geographers, ecologists, biologists, microbiologists, silviculturists, sanitarians, archaeologists, and specialists in regional planning, all contribute to further knowledge of soils and the advancement of the soil sciences.

Soil scientists have raised concerns about how to preserve soil and arable land in a world with a growing population, possible future water crisis, increasing per capita food consumption, and land degradation.

Fields of study
Soil occupies the pedosphere, one of Earth's spheres that the geosciences use to organize the Earth conceptually. This is the conceptual perspective of pedology and edaphology, the two main branches of soil science. Pedology is the study of soil in its natural setting. Edaphology is the study of soil in relation to soil-dependent uses. Both branches apply a combination of soil physics, soil chemistry, and soil biology. Due to the numerous interactions between the biosphere, atmosphere and hydrosphere that are hosted within the pedosphere, more integrated, less soil-centric concepts are also valuable. Many concepts essential to understanding soil come from individuals not identifiable strictly as soil scientists. This highlights the interdisciplinary nature of soil concepts.

Research
Dependence on and curiosity about soil, exploring the diversity and dynamics of this resource continues to yield fresh discoveries and insights.  New avenues of soil research are compelled by a need to understand soil in the context of climate change, greenhouse gases, and carbon sequestration. Interest in maintaining the planet's biodiversity and in exploring past cultures has also stimulated renewed interest in achieving a more refined understanding of soil.

Mapping

Classification

In 1998, the World Reference Base for Soil Resources (WRB) replaced the FAO soil classification as the international soil classification system. The currently valid version of WRB is the 4th edition, 2022. The FAO soil classification, in turn, borrowed from modern soil classification concepts, including USDA soil taxonomy.

WRB is based mainly on soil morphology as an expression of pedogenesis. A major difference with USDA soil taxonomy is that soil climate is not part of the system, except insofar as climate influences soil profile characteristics.

Many other classification schemes exist, including vernacular systems. The structure in vernacular systems are either nominal, giving unique names to soils or landscapes, or descriptive, naming soils by their characteristics such as red, hot, fat, or sandy. Soils are distinguished by obvious characteristics, such as physical appearance (e.g., color, texture, landscape position), performance (e.g., production capability, flooding), and accompanying vegetation. A vernacular distinction familiar to many is classifying texture as heavy or light. Light soil content and better structure, take less effort to turn and cultivate. Contrary to popular belief, light soils do not weigh less than heavy soils on an air dry basis nor do they have more porosity.

History
The earliest known soil classification system comes from China, appearing in the book Yu Gong (5th century BCE), where the soil was divided into three categories and nine classes, depending on its color, texture and hydrology.

Contemporaries Friedrich Albert Fallou, the German founder of modern soil science, and Vasily Dokuchaev, the Russian founder of modern soil science, are both credited with being among the first to identify soil as a resource whose distinctness and complexity deserved to be separated conceptually from geology and crop production and treated as a whole. As a founding father of soil science Fallou has primacy in time. Fallou was working on the origins of soil before Dokuchaev was born, however Dokuchaev's work was more extensive and is considered to be the more significant to modern soil theory than Fallou's.

Previously, soil had been considered a product of chemical transformations of rocks, a dead substrate from which plants derive nutritious elements. Soil and bedrock were in fact equated. Dokuchaev considers the soil as a natural body having its own genesis and its own history of development, a body with complex and multiform processes taking place within it. The soil is considered as different from bedrock. The latter becomes soil under the influence of a series of soil-formation factors (climate, vegetation, country, relief and age). According to him, soil should be called the "daily" or outward horizons of rocks regardless of the type; they are changed naturally by the common effect of water, air and various kinds of living and dead organisms.

A 1914 encyclopedic definition: "the different forms of earth on the surface of the rocks, formed by the breaking down or weathering of rocks". serves to illustrate the historic view of soil which persisted from the 19th century. Dokuchaev's late 19th century soil concept developed in the 20th century to one of soil as earthy material that has been altered by living processes. A corollary concept is that soil without a living component is simply a part of earth's outer layer.

Further refinement of the soil concept is occurring in view of an appreciation of energy transport and transformation within soil. The term is popularly applied to the material on the surface of the Earth's moon and Mars, a usage acceptable within a portion of the scientific community. Accurate to this modern understanding of soil is Nikiforoff's 1959 definition of soil as the "excited skin of the sub aerial part of the earth's crust".

Areas of practice
Academically, soil scientists tend to be drawn to one of five areas of specialization: microbiology, pedology, edaphology, physics, or chemistry. Yet the work specifics are very much dictated by the challenges facing our civilization's desire to sustain the land that supports it, and the distinctions between the sub-disciplines of soil science often blur in the process. Soil science professionals commonly stay current in soil chemistry, soil physics, soil microbiology, pedology, and applied soil science in related disciplines

One interesting effort drawing in soil scientists in the USA  is the Soil Quality Initiative. Central to the Soil Quality Initiative is developing indices of soil health and then monitoring them in a way that gives us long term (decade-to-decade) feedback on our performance as stewards of the planet. The effort includes understanding the functions of soil microbiotic crusts and exploring the potential to sequester atmospheric carbon in soil organic matter. The concept of agriculture in relation to soil quality, however, has not been without its share of controversy and criticism, including critiques by Nobel Laureate Norman Borlaug and World Food Prize Winner Pedro Sanchez.

A more traditional role for soil scientists has been to map soils. Most every area in the United States now has a published soil survey, which includes interpretive tables as to how soil properties support or limit activities and uses. An internationally accepted soil taxonomy allows uniform communication of soil characteristics and soil functions. National and international soil survey efforts have given the profession unique insights into landscape scale functions. The landscape functions that soil scientists are called upon to address in the field seem to fall roughly into six areas:

 Land-based treatment of wastes
Septic system
Manure
Municipal biosolids
Food and fiber processing waste
 Identification and protection of environmentally critical areas
Sensitive and unstable soils
Wetlands
Unique soil situations that support valuable habitat, and ecosystem diversity
 Management for optimum land productivity
Silviculture
Agronomy
Nutrient management
Water management
Native vegetation
Grazing
 Management for optimum water quality
Stormwater management
Sediment and erosion control
 Remediation and restoration of damaged lands
Mine reclamation
Flood and storm damage
Contamination
 Sustainability of desired uses
Soil conservation

There are also practical applications of soil science that might not be apparent from looking at a published soil survey.

 Radiometric dating: specifically a knowledge of local pedology is used to date prior activity at the site
Stratification (archeology) where soil formation processes and preservative qualities can inform the study of archaeological sites
Geological phenomena
Landslides
Active faults
 Altering soils to achieve new uses
Vitrification to contain radioactive wastes
Enhancing soil microbial capabilities in degrading contaminants (bioremediation).
Carbon sequestration
 Environmental soil science
 Pedology
 Soil genesis
 Pedometrics
 Soil morphology
 Soil micromorphology
 Soil classification
USDA soil taxonomy
World Reference Base for Soil Resources
 Soil biology
 Soil microbiology
 Soil chemistry
 Soil biochemistry
 Soil mineralogy
 Soil physics
 Pedotransfer function
 Soil mechanics and engineering
 Soil hydrology, hydropedology

Fields of application in soil science
 Climate change
 Ecosystem studies
 Pedotransfer function
 Soil fertility / Nutrient management
 Soil management
 Soil survey
 Standard methods of analysis
 Watershed and wetland studies

Related disciplines
 Agricultural sciences
 Agricultural soil science
 Agrophysics science
 Irrigation management
 Anthropology
 archaeological stratigraphy
 Environmental science
 Landscape ecology
 Physical geography
 Geomorphology
 Geology
 Biogeochemistry
 Geomicrobiology
 Hydrology
 Hydrogeology
 Waste management
 Wetland science

Depression storage capacity 
Depression storage capacity, in soil science, is the ability of a particular area of land to retain water in its pits and depressions, thus preventing it from flowing. Depression storage capacity, along with infiltration capacity, is one of the main factors involved in Horton overland flow, whereby water volume surpasses both infiltration and depression storage capacity and begins to flow horizontally across land, possibly leading to flooding and soil erosion. The study of land's depression storage capacity is important in the fields of geology, ecology, and especially hydrology.

See also

 Agricultural soil science
Agroecology
Agrology
Agrophysics
Australian Society of Soil Science Incorporated (ASSSI)
 Compost
 History of soil science
International Soil Reference and Information Centre (ISRIC)
International Union of Soil Sciences (IUSS)
Liming (soil)
List of Russian Earth scientists
List of State Soil Science Associations
List of State Soil Science Licensing Boards
National Society of Consulting Soil Scientists (NSCSS)
Resonant column test
 Soil biology
Soil Science Society of America (SSSA)
Soil value
World Congress of Soil Science (WCSS)

References

 Soil Survey Staff (1993). Soil Survey: Early Concepts of Soil. (html) Soil Survey Manual USDA Handbook 18, Soil Conservation Service. U.S. Department of Agriculture. URL accessed on 2004-11-30.
 

 
Earth sciences